Yevgeny Nikolayevich Karlov (31 May 1960 – 11 April 1992) was a soldier during the First Nagorno-Karabakh War in the early 1990s. He was made a National Hero of Azerbaijan.

Early life and education 
Karlov was born on 31 May 1960 in Dubovka village of Bogoroditsky District of Tula Oblast. He completed his secondary education at Dubovka village secondary school. In 1977, Karlov was drafted to the military service by the Military Commissariat of Uzlovaya. In 1976, he entered the Syzran Higher Military Aviation School. After the graduation in 1984, he started working as an instructor-pilot. After the establishment of Azerbaijani Armed Forces, Karlov decided to serve here. He first worked as an instructor pilot in Sanqaçal, then in the N military unit in Baku.

Personal life 
Karlov was married and had two children.

First Nagorno-Karabakh War 
When the First Nagorno-Karabakh War started, Karlov participated in battles around Aghdam, Aghdara and Fuzuli. On April 11, 1992, he was killed in a battle when Armenian soldiers attacked the territories of Fuzuli District.

Honors 
Yevgeny Nikolayevich Karlov was posthumously awarded the title of the "National Hero of Azerbaijan" by Presidential Decree No. 833 dated 7 June 1992.

He was buried at a cemetery in Dubovka village of Bogoroditsky District of Tula Oblast.

See also 
 First Nagorno-Karabakh War
 National Hero of Azerbaijan

References

Sources 
Vugar Asgarov. Azərbaycanın Milli Qəhrəmanları (Yenidən işlənmiş II nəşr). Bakı: "Dərələyəz-M", 2010, səh. 147.

1960 births
1992 deaths
Azerbaijani military personnel
Azerbaijani military personnel of the Nagorno-Karabakh War
Azerbaijani military personnel killed in action
National Heroes of Azerbaijan
People from Tula Oblast
Syzran Higher Military Aviation School alumni